Lawrence Ari Fleischer (born October 13, 1960) is an American media consultant and political aide who served as the 23rd White House Press Secretary, for President George W. Bush, from January 2001 to July 2003.

As press secretary in the Bush administration, Fleischer was a prominent advocate for the invasion of Iraq. Since leaving the White House, he has worked as a media consultant and commentator. He joined Fox News as a contributor in July 2017.

Early life
Fleischer was born in 1960 in New York City, the son of Martha and Alan A. Fleischer. His mother was a database coordinator and his father was owner of an executive recruiting company. His parents were Jewish; his mother is a Hungarian immigrant who lost much of her family in the Holocaust. Both parents were Democrats who were "horrified" when Fleischer became a Republican, he told an interviewer in 2003: "While I lived at home and when I started college, I was a liberal Democrat. In a sense, it was President Carter who drove me out of the Democratic Party and it was President Reagan who welcomed me into the Republican Party." He graduated from Fox Lane High School in Bedford, New York, in 1978, and graduated from Middlebury College in Vermont in 1982.

Congressional staffer
Upon his graduation from Middlebury, Fleischer worked as press secretary for Jon S. Fossel, a Republican candidate for a New York congressional seat. Later Fleischer worked as press secretary for Norman Lent. From 1985 to 1988, he was field director for the National Republican Congressional Committee. He went back to being a press secretary in 1988, working for congressman Joseph DioGuardi.

Fleischer served as U.S. Senator Pete Domenici's press secretary from 1989 to 1994 and as spokesman for the House of Representatives Ways and Means Committee for five years. He worked as deputy communications director for George H. W. Bush's 1992 reelection campaign.

White House press secretary

Although Fleischer served as communications director for Elizabeth Dole during her presidential run in the 2000 election campaign, he joined George W. Bush's presidential campaign after Dole dropped out of the race. When Bush became the President in 2001, he tapped Fleischer to become the first press secretary of his administration.

Fleischer is credited with having been the first to introduce the phrase "homicide bombing" to describe what has also been called suicide bombing, in April 2002, to emphasize the terrorist connotations of the tactic:

On May 19, 2003, he announced that he would resign during the summer, citing a desire to spend more time with his wife and to work in the private sector. He was replaced by deputy press secretary Scott McClellan on July 15, 2003.

Iraq War 
As press secretary in the Bush administration, Fleischer was a prominent advocate for the Invasion of Iraq. He made numerous exaggerated and misleading claims about Iraq in the lead-up to the Iraq War, in particular about Iraq's purported WMD program (it did not have one) and the Saddam Hussein regime's purported relationship with al-Qaeda (they did not have an operational relationship). In January 2003, after UN weapons inspectors said they had "not found any smoking gun" evidence of an active WMD program, Fleischer said, "The problem with guns that are hidden is you can't see their smoke... We know for a fact that there are weapons there." (there were not) On the issue of whether the Saddam Hussein regime had sought to obtain uranium from Niger, Fleischer said that it was "an issue that very well may be true. We don’t know if it’s true—but nobody, but nobody, can say it is wrong." In his press conferences, he repeatedly insisted that the burden of proof for the non-existence of the Hussein regime's WMD program fell on Saddam Hussein, not on the Bush administration to prove that he did have an active WMD program. On one occasion Fleischer said that Hussein "has to indicate whether or not he has weapons. . . . If he declares he has none, then we will know that Saddam Hussein is once again misleading the world. . . . If Saddam Hussein indicates that he has weapons of mass destruction and that he is violating United Nations resolutions, then we will know that Saddam Hussein again deceived the world."

In 2019, Fleischer said, "It’s a myth that Bush lied" about Iraq, resulting in backlash. Fleischer claimed that he and Bush "faithfully and accurately reported" the assessments of the Intelligence community. "Operation Avarice", a covert CIA operation to buy up WMD's in Iraq, did secure over 400 missiles and rockets containing chemical weapons, mostly Sarin nerve-gas, between 2005 and 2006. In some cases the missile's toxicity was over 25%, much higher than expected. Some details of the classified operation were revealed by the NY Times in 2015. Additionally, hundreds and possibly thousands of US troops were exposed to various chemical weapons during cleanup operations when about 5,000 chemical warheads, shells or aviation bombs were located and demolished in Iraq. Some of the cases of exposure were hushed up at the time, as the military did not want to reveal that there were chemical agents around lest they be used by terrorists in conjunction with IEDs.

Torture 
In 2003, Fleischer said, "The standard for any type of interrogation of somebody in American custody is to be humane and to follow all international laws and accords dealing with this type subject. That is precisely what has been happening and exactly what will happen." The administration used waterboarding, sleep deprivation and forced nudity against suspected combatants and suspected terrorists.

In 2009, when the Department of Justice of the Obama administration launched a probe into alleged CIA interrogation abuses, Fleischer described the decision as "disgusting." Fleischer said if he were subpoenaed in an investigation of alleged interrogation abuses, "I'll be proud to testify... I'm proud of what we did to protect this country."

Alleged role in Plame affair

Fleischer became an important figure in the CIA leak case; he testified that Scooter Libby, Vice President Dick Cheney's former chief of staff, told him that Valerie Plame was a covert agent weeks before Libby had claimed to have been informed of Plame's status by a reporter.

On July 7, 2003, at The James S. Brady Briefing Room, Fleischer was asked about Joseph Wilson, a former U.S. ambassador who had recently written an editorial for The New York Times criticizing the intelligence information the Bush administration had relied upon to make its case for invading the nation of Iraq. Specifically, Fleischer was asked to respond to Mr. Wilson's assertion that he had been sent to Niger to investigate claims that Saddam Hussein had sought yellowcake uranium and found no evidence that such events had ever occurred.

Fleischer testified in open court on January 29, 2007, that Libby told him on July 7, 2003, at lunch, about Plame, who is Wilson's wife. MSNBC correspondent David Shuster summarized Fleisher's testimony on Hardball with Chris Matthews:

Fleischer also testified to the fact that Dan Bartlett, the president's communications adviser, told him the same thing on Air Force One days later on the way to Niger with President Bush. Fleischer had then relayed this information to Time correspondent John Dickerson and NBC's David Gregory in Uganda during the African trip.

Dickerson denied that such a conversation ever took place. Fleischer gave his final "Press Briefing" on July 14, 2003.

On July 18, 2005, Bloomberg reported that in his sworn testimony before the grand jury investigating the leak, Fleischer denied having seen a memo circulating in Air Force One on July 7, 2003, which named Plame in connection to Wilson's mission and which identified her as a "CIA" covert agent. However, a former Bush Administration official also on the plane testified to having seen Fleischer perusing the document.

Columnist Robert Novak, who published Plame's name on July 14, 2003, made a call to Fleischer on July 7, 2003, before Fleischer's trip to Africa with President Bush. It is unclear whether Fleischer returned Novak's call. However, Fleischer is mentioned in Special Prosecutor Patrick Fitzgerald's indictment of Libby. The indictment states that Libby told Fleischer (referred to as the White House press secretary in the indictment) that Plame worked for the "CIA" and that this fact was not well known.

After receiving an immunity agreement, Fleischer testified that he had revealed Plame's identity to reporters after learning it from Libby. However, in the end it was discovered that Richard Armitage first leaked Plame's identity, not Libby or Cheney.

Media bias 
In his book Suppression, Deception, Snobbery, and Bias: Why the Press Gets So Much Wrong ― and Just Doesn't Care, Fleischer argues that "there's a younger generation of journalists … who think their job is to be subjective" and that "They don't believe in objectivity. They don't believe in two sides. They believe that their side, particularly on social issues and on racial matters, is the only right side."

Consultancy firm
Today he works as a media consultant for various corporations and sports organizations and players through his company, Ari Fleischer Communications. He has consulted for former Canadian prime minister Stephen Harper, Mark McGwire, the Washington Redskins, Tiger Woods and the Green Bay Packers.

He also worked with the Saudi Arabian LIV Golf Tour.

Memoir
Fleischer published a memoir, Taking Heat: The President, the Press and My Years in the White House, in 2005. Michiko Kakutani wrote in The New York Times, "[T]his book does not provide any new insights into the workings of the current White House. It does not present compelling portraits of cabinet members or members of the White House supporting cast. And it does not shed new light on the president or his methods of governance." She found the book "insular, defensive and wholly predictable." In Salon.com, Eric Boehlert declared that despite "a few curious nuggets," the book is "long on praise for his boss and criticism of the 'liberal' media, and short on revelations."

Personal life
In November 2002, Fleischer married Rebecca Elizabeth Davis, an employee in the Office of Management and Budget, in an interfaith ceremony. Rabbi Harold S. White officiated the ceremony, with the participation of Rev. Michael J. Kelley, a Roman Catholic priest. They reside in New York with their son and daughter. They have been raising their children Jewish and are members of a synagogue in Westchester, New York. Fleischer's brother, Michael, worked for the Coalition Provisional Authority in Iraq.

He is on the board of the Republican Jewish Coalition.

He enjoys playing baseball and is a member of the two-time President's Cup champion Ridgefield Rockers.

In other media
Fleischer is portrayed by Rob Corddry in Oliver Stone's W., a biographical movie about George W. Bush.

See also

Notes

References

Further reading
 Hitchens, Christopher. "Fear Factor: How did we survive Ari Fleischer's reign of terror?" Slate. Monday September 11, 2006.
 Klickstein, Mathew. "How to Speak for the President" "Baltimore Jewish Times". Wednesday December 14, 2016

External links

 Transcripts of all White House press briefings since 2001
 Ari Fleischer Communications
 

1960 births
American people of Hungarian-Jewish descent
George W. Bush administration personnel
Jewish American government officials
Living people
Middlebury College alumni
New York (state) Republicans
People associated with the Plame affair
People from Pound Ridge, New York
People from Washington, D.C.
Washington, D.C., Republicans
White House Press Secretaries